National identity cards in China may refer to the following identity documents:
People's Republic of China
Resident Identity Card (PRC)
Republic of China
National Identification Card
Hong Kong Special Administrative Region
National identity cards in Hong Kong:
Hong Kong Identity Card (HKID)
Hong Kong Permanent Identity Card
Macau Special Administrative Region
National identity cards in Macau:
Macau Special Administrative Region Resident Identity Card (Bilhete de Identidade de Residente)
Macau Special Administrative Region Permanent Resident Identity Card
Macau Special Administrative Region Non-Permanent Resident Identity Card

See also 
Identity document
List of national identity card policies by country
Singapore's National Registration Identity Card (NRIC),

Government of China
China